Baghuiyeh-ye Do (also Romanized as Bāghū’īyeh-ye Do; also known as Bāghūyeh) is a village in Hanza Rural District, Hanza District, Rabor County, Kerman Province, Iran. At the 2006 census, its population was 365, in 81 families.

References 

Populated places in Rabor County